Vysoké Tatry, formally Mesto Vysoké Tatry is a town at the feet of the Slovak part of High Tatras in Slovakia including all the major resorts in that region. It was created in 1990, and its official name from 1990 to 1999 was Starý Smokovec, which is the name of one of its major settlements.

Features and statistics 
The town of Vysoké Tatry is special in many aspects. It is not a true town, but a conglomerate of separate and different settlements (originally separate villages), whose only common feature is that they are the main tourist resorts in the Slovak High Tatras, while being connected through a common railway network (the Tatra Railway). After the country's capital, the town is Slovakia's major tourist destination. It has around 4,000 inhabitants, excluding tourists. Covering , it is Slovakia's second-largest urban area, after the country's capital, and was the largest until 2007, when the village of Štrbské Pleso became a part of Štrba after Štrba's municipal government's successful claim on the Supreme Court.

The local authority, cultural centre, and main shops are located in the settlement of Starý Smokovec.

Administrative division 
The town consists of three cadastral areas, which consist of 14 settlements.

History 
The present-day town was created in 1990 and has a complicated administrative history.

The municipality (that is, not a town) of Vysoké Tatry was created as early as 1947 on the territory of the following formerly distinct municipalities: Batizovce, Huncovce, Folvarky, Gerlachov, Kežmarok, Liptovská Kokava, Mlynica, Nová Lesná, Malý Slavkov, Mengusovce,výbor Vysoké Tatry" - literally, "The United National Committee of High Tatras", 'national committee' being the term then used to designate local authorities in Czechoslovakia.

In 1954, parts of the municipalities Pribylina (the majority of which was returned in 2004), Východná, and Liptovská Kokava were added to Vysoké Tatry. Starý Smokovec was made the seat of the Vysoké Tatry municipality.

In 1960, the Vysoké Tatry municipality ceased to exist and was divided into the following separate municipalities: Starý Smokovec (enhanced with town status), Štrbské Pleso, Tatranská Lomnica, Ždiar, and Štôla. However, since 1964 these municipalities had again a common local authority, although they remained distinct municipalities.

In 1990, three of the above municipalities - Starý Smokovec, Štrbské pleso and Tatranská Lomnica - were merged to create the town of 'Starý Smokovec'(named after the settlement serving as the seat of the authorities). The remaining municipalities - Ždiar and Štôla - are still independent municipalities.

In 1999, the town of 'Starý Smokovec' was renamed 'Vysoké Tatry'.

Demographics 
On 31 December 2006, Vysoké Tatry had a population of 4,718. According to the 2001 census, 92.95% of inhabitants were Slovaks, 2.22% Czechs, 0.57% Hungarians, 0.26% Germans, and 0.17% Rusyns. The religious make-up was as follows: 61.96% Roman Catholics, 18.96% people with no religious affiliation, 7.64% Lutherans, and 3.62% Greek Catholics.

Sport 
In 1935 and 1970 the area hosted the FIS Nordic World Ski Championships. The area was scheduled to host the 17th Winter Deaflympics, but the event was cancelled because of the lack of readiness by the Slovakian Deaflympic Organizing Committee to host the games.

Notable people 
Ludwig Greiner, identified Gerlachovský Peak as the summit of the Tatras, Carpathians

Twin towns — sister cities 

Vysoké Tatry is twinned with:

 Bukowina Tatrzańska, Poland
 Košice, Slovakia (since 2006)

 Nosegawa, Japan
 Pardubice, Czech Republic
 Poprad, Slovakia
 Zakopane, Poland

References 
Notes

External links 

Official site

Cities and towns in Slovakia
Villages and municipalities in Poprad District
Spiš
High Tatras
Ski areas and resorts in Slovakia